Amanda Elizabeth James (born 25 October 1960) is a British former swimmer. James competed in the women's 100 metre backstroke at the 1976 Summer Olympics. At the ASA National British Championships she won the 100 metres backstroke title twice (1976 and 1978).

References

External links
 

1960 births
Living people
British female swimmers
Olympic swimmers of Great Britain
Swimmers at the 1976 Summer Olympics
Place of birth missing (living people)